Oakhampton is a suburb in the City of Maitland in the Hunter Region of New South Wales, Australia.

The traditional owners and custodians of the Maitland area are the Wonnarua people.

References